Charles Griffiths (died 15 May 1936) was an English football player and manager. He played in England, and coached in Belgium, France, Germany and the Netherlands in the early 20th century.

Playing career
Griffiths was born in Rugby and played as an inside-forward for Luton Town and  Barrow before joining  Preston North End in 1907. He then made one appearance in the Football League for Lincoln City in 1907. He also played for Oswestry Olympics, Chirk, Oswestry United, St Helens Town, Barnsley, Coventry City, Wellington Town and Wrexham.

Coaching career
In 1910, he worked for Karlsruher FV, during his time with the club, they won the Southern German championship.

In August 1911, he was appointed as the first full-time manager of Bayern Munich, however his time at the club was to last only seven months at the Bavarian club and was dismissed on 6 April 1912. He had however convinced the Bayern board members that a full-time coach was beneficial to the club.

He would go on to manage Stuttgarter Kickers, he won the Southern German championship during his first season with the club and his second season was curtailed due to the breakout of World War I.

Griffiths was part of the coaching staff for the Belgium national team in 1920 when they won the Olympic Games Football at the 1920 Summer Olympics football tournament.

The same article also suggested that he won a Belgian championship with Royale Union Saint Gilloise in 1923.

He managed Dutch club side Vitesse Arnhem between 1920 and 1922 and Be Quick in the 1922 Championship play-off.

In September 1923, he joined Olympique Lillois.

In February 1924, he was appointed as the head coach for the France national team. He was in what was described as a 'federal' position and the team was selected by committee.

He was appointed as manager at Belgian club side Berchem Sport in 1925.

He won the Coupe de France in 1933 whilst manager at Excelsior AC Roubaix, but he soon moved on, returning to his former club Royale Union Saint-Gilloise. During his second spell at Union SG, he won the league in three consecutive seasons 1933–1935.

Griffiths died in a hospital in Rugby on 15 May 1936.

References

Year of birth missing
Sportspeople from Rugby, Warwickshire
1936 deaths
English footballers
Association football inside forwards
Luton Town F.C. players
Barrow A.F.C. players
Preston North End F.C. players
Lincoln City F.C. players
English Football League players
English football managers
English expatriate sportspeople in the Netherlands
English expatriate sportspeople in France
English expatriate sportspeople in Germany
English expatriate sportspeople in Belgium
English expatriate football managers
Expatriate football managers in France
Expatriate football managers in Germany
Expatriate football managers in Belgium
Expatriate football managers in the Netherlands
FC Bayern Munich managers
Stuttgarter Kickers managers
SBV Vitesse managers
Chirk AAA F.C. players
St Helens Town A.F.C. players
Barnsley F.C. players
Coventry City F.C. players
Telford United F.C. players
Wrexham A.F.C. players
Karlsruher FV managers
Olympique Lillois managers
Oswestry United F.C. players